Britton Weaver Johnsen (born July 8, 1979) is an American retired professional basketball player who played briefly in the National Basketball Association (NBA). He graduated from Murray High School and the University of Utah. Born in Salt Lake City, his hometown is Murray, Utah. Johnsen is a member of the Church of Jesus Christ of Latter-day Saints.

College career 
Johnsen played college basketball with the University of Utah's Utah Utes.

Professional career 
Johnsen was selected with the #19 pick of the Continental Basketball Association (CBA) draft by the Gary Steelheads in 2003. He then played briefly for the Orlando Magic in the NBA in the 2003–04 NBA season averaging 2.1 points and 2.1 rebounds per game. He then played with the New Orleans Hornets during the 2004 NBA preseason and with the Indiana Pacers in the 2004–05 NBA season averaging 2.0 points and 1.7 rebounds per game.

He also played with the summer league squad of the Utah Jazz at the Rocky Mountain Revue and with the Jazz during their preseason training camp in the year 2008.

He also played in the NBA D-League with the Fayetteville Patriots, the Bakersfield Jam, and the Utah Flash and in the CBA with the Idaho Stampede.

Overseas 
Johnsen also played overseas for several professional clubs. He moved to the Spanish ACB League club Etosa Alicante in 2005. He then moved to the Greek A1 League club Panellinios Athens in 2006.

In 2007, he joined the French Pro A League club Élan Béarnais Pau-Orthez. In 2008, he moved to the Turkish League club Galatasaray Café Crown. In 2009, he joined the Greek team PAOK Thessaloniki. A year later, he signed with Panellinios B.C. In 2011, he joined the Argentine team Quilmes de Mar del Plata.

References

Sources 
NBA Profile @ NBA.com
Euroleague.net Profile
Basketpedya.com Profile
TSN.ca Career Transactions
NBA D-League Profile

External links 
FIBA profile
TBLStat.net profile
Britton Johnsen NBA Statistics @ Basketballreference.com
Utah Utes bio

1979 births
Living people
American expatriate basketball people in Argentina
American expatriate basketball people in France
American expatriate basketball people in Greece
American expatriate basketball people in Spain
American expatriate basketball people in Turkey
American men's basketball players
Bakersfield Jam players
Basketball players from Salt Lake City
CB Lucentum Alicante players
Élan Béarnais players
Fayetteville Patriots players
Galatasaray S.K. (men's basketball) players
Indiana Pacers players
Latter Day Saints from Utah
Liga ACB players
McDonald's High School All-Americans
Orlando Magic players
Panellinios B.C. players
P.A.O.K. BC players
Parade High School All-Americans (boys' basketball)
People from Murray, Utah
Power forwards (basketball)
Quilmes de Mar del Plata basketball players
Small forwards
Undrafted National Basketball Association players
Utah Flash players
Utah Utes men's basketball players